The 1882 South Carolina gubernatorial election was held on November 7, 1882 to select the governor of the state of South Carolina. Hugh Smith Thompson was nominated by the Democrats and ran against J. Hendrix McLane, a Greenback-Labor candidate. Thompson easily won the general election and became the 81st governor of South Carolina.

Democratic Convention

Candidates
 John Bratton, Comptroller General
 John Kennedy, Lieutenant Governor 
 Hugh Smith Thompson, Superintendent of Education

Declined
 Johnson Hagood, incumbent Governor
 Wade Hampton, former Governor
 George D. Tillman, U.S. Representative

Campaign
Governor Johnson Hagood chose not to seek reelection in 1882 and two former generals in the Confederate Army emerged as the frontrunners, Lieutenant Governor John Kennedy and Comptroller General John Bratton. Both men were loyal followers of Wade Hampton, neither had supported Martin Witherspoon Gary, and both were dedicated Democrats. However, many in the state wanted a new direction and the candidacy of George D. Tillman quickly gained pace. Others feared that an intra-party fight over the nomination would bring back Radical Republican rule and only the return of Senator Hampton could save the party. Even so, both Tillman and Hampton declined and chose to continue their representation in the Congress.

Hugh Smith Thompson, the state Superintendent of Education since 1876, had declined to be a candidate for governor and instead lobbied for the presidency of South Carolina College. However, with the opening of the state Democratic convention in August, Thompson was nominated for governor alongside Kennedy and Bratton. After the second ballot with momentum in Thompson's favor, both Kennedy and Bratton withdrew their names thus allowing Thompson to be the Democrats nominee for the general election.

Results

Greenback-Labor Convention
Following their disastrous defeat in the gubernatorial election of 1880, the Greenback-Labor party members met with state Republican leaders to fuse and offer a joint ticket for the general election. In a January interview with the News and Courier, McLane stated that the Greenbacks would get 150,000 votes in the general election and sweep the statewide offices.

A convention for the Greenbacks was held in Columbia with over one hundred delegates from 22 counties, even including a Democratic state senator. McLane was nominated for the governorship and candidates were fielded for six of the seven congressional districts, the seventh district being a heavily black district held by the Republicans.

The platform outlined by the Greenbacks for the election was:
 Congress to issue legal greenbacks.
 Condemning government bonds.
 Denouncing the lien law, stock law, and the election law.

General election
The general election was held on November 7, 1882 and Hugh Smith Thompson was elected as governor of South Carolina with nominal opposition. Turnout was less than the previous gubernatorial election because of the increasingly uncompetitive nature of the election in South Carolina.

 

|-
| 
| colspan=5 |Democratic hold
|-

See also
Governor of South Carolina
List of governors of South Carolina
South Carolina gubernatorial elections

References

"Election Returns." Reports and Resolutions of the General Assembly of the State of South Carolina. Columbia, South Carolina: Charles A. Calvo, Jr., 1883, p. 1719.

External links
SCIway Biography of Governor Hugh Smith Thompson

1882 United States gubernatorial elections
1882
Gubernatorial
November 1882 events